The 1929 Yale Bulldogs football team represented Yale University in the 1929 college football season. In their second year under head coach Mal Stevens, the Bulldogs compiled a 5–2–1 record.

Schedule

References

Yale
Yale Bulldogs football seasons
Yale Bulldogs football